KBIL may refer to:

 The ICAO code for Billings Logan International Airport
 KBIL (FM), an FM radio station licensed to Park City, Montana, United States
 Identification used from 1949 to 1983 by a carrier current radio station operated at Saint Louis University (now KSLU)